Abronia oaxacae, the Oaxacan arboreal alligator lizard, is a vulnerable species of arboreal alligator lizard described in 1885 by Albert C. L. G. Günther. It is endemic to Oaxaca, Mexico.

Distribution and habitat
Abronia oaxacae is found in the central Oaxaca state, Mexico.

It is an arboreal species found in primary pine-oak forest. It has been recorded from moderately disturbed areas.

References

Abronia
Endemic reptiles of Mexico
Reptiles described in 1885
Taxa named by Albert Günther